Jean Struven Harris (April 27, 1923 – December 23, 2012) was the headmistress of The Madeira School for girls in McLean, Virginia, who made national news in the early 1980s when she was tried and convicted of the murder of her ex-lover, Herman Tarnower, a well-known cardiologist and author of the best-selling book The Complete Scarsdale Medical Diet. The case is featured on the TV show Murder Made Me Famous.

Biography
Born Jean Struven on April 27, 1923, in Chicago, Illinois, to Albert and Mildred Struven, Harris was the second of four children. She went to Laurel School in Shaker Heights, Ohio, before attending Smith College in Northampton, Massachusetts. In 1945, she graduated magna cum laude from Smith with a degree in economics. After college, she married Jim Harris and they had two sons by 1952. In 1965, Harris divorced her husband, who died in 1977.

Harris met Tarnower, a cardiologist (later known as the "Scarsdale Diet Doctor" due to a popular diet book he published), in December 1966, the year after her divorce. They then began a 14-year relationship. Though Tarnower showered Harris with gifts and exotic vacations, he had relationships with multiple other women during these years.

Harris worked as the headmistress of the Madeira School for girls in McLean, Virginia, while continuing her long-distance relationship with Tarnower. Harris was aware of Tarnower's other relationships; he did not hide them from her. Tarnower prescribed Harris multiple medications over the course of several years, including methamphetamines. In the 1970s, Tarnower hired Lynne Tryforos, a divorcee more than thirty years his junior, to work as a secretary-receptionist at the Scarsdale Medical Center. Tarnower then began an affair with Tryforos.

Killing
In late winter 1980, Madeira students were preparing to leave for their break when some staged a "sit-in" protest that denounced the educators and headmistress of Madeira. Harris was troubled by the actions of the students. On the evening of March 9, Madeira faculty members noted she seemed despondent and distant. It was later learned that she was physically addicted to one of her prescriptions, unknowingly at the time.

On March 10, 1980, Harris made a five-hour, 264-mile drive from the Madeira School in Virginia to Herman Tarnower's home in Purchase, New York, with a .32 caliber revolver in her possession. She later stated that she had planned to commit suicide after talking in person with Tarnower one last time. When she arrived at the house, she noticed Tryforos' lingerie in the bedroom. An argument ensued, and Tarnower allegedly said to her, "Jesus, Jean, you're crazy! Get out of here!" According to Harris a struggle over the gun ensued when Harris told Tarnower she was going to kill herself. Prosecutors disputed her claim, noting that she had placed extra ammunition in her pocket before confronting Tarnower. Harris shot Tarnower four times at close range. She later reported that she tried phoning for help from the upstairs bedroom, but that phone was not working. She left in her car to get help not knowing Tarnower's housekeeper had already phoned the police after hearing the gunshots. Harris saw police cars driving past her, headed in the direction of Tarnower's home. She turned her car around and followed the police cars back to his home. She was ultimately arrested and booked for second-degree murder. She pled not guilty, insisting that the shooting was an accident in that the gun had gone off accidentally and repeatedly while Tarnower tried to wrest it away from her.

Legal defense and trial
Harris was released on $80,000 bail raised by her brother and sisters and signed into the United Hospital of Port Chester for psychiatric evaluation and therapy. She then contracted the services of attorneys Joel Aurnou and Bonnie Steingart to plan her defense.

The case went to trial at the Westchester County Courthouse in White Plains, New York, on November 21, 1980, and was prosecuted by Assistant District Attorney George Bolen. The trial lasted 14 weeks, becoming one of the longest in state history. The New York press sensationalized the trial and made Harris a household name from coast-to-coast. Harris took the stand and testified at length in her own defense, but the jury rejected her story that the shooting had been accidental and convicted her of second-degree murder after eight days of deliberations. Consequently, Harris was not legally eligible to inherit $220,000 Tarnower had bequeathed to her in his will.

Harris consistently maintained that she did not intentionally kill Tarnower. Joel Aurnou later stated that he encouraged his client to plead guilty to a lesser charge, but she refused. Because the defense had gone for broke in their quest for a complete acquittal, the jury was not offered the option of finding Harris guilty of manslaughter, and the mental health professionals who tested and treated Harris were not called to testify. Judge Russell R. Leggett ordered her confined to the Bedford Hills Correctional Facility for Women in Westchester County, New York, for the minimum of 15 years to life. Numerous appeals followed the conviction, but the higher courts determined that she had received a fair trial. While serving her sentence, Harris made it her mission to improve the education of fellow inmates in her facility. She began programs in which women could work toward obtaining their GEDs or college degrees while imprisoned. She also taught a parenting class to inmates and developed the in-prison nursery for babies born to inmates.

Chief Medical Examiner-Coroner for the County of Los Angeles Thomas Noguchi, along with ballistic and bloodstain expert Herbert MacDonnell, analyzed the case in Noguchi's 1985 book Coroner at Large. 

In the book's chapter "For Love of Hy" both men come to the conclusion that Harris was innocent of second-degree murder, and that Harris had engaged in a struggle for the murder weapon, a pistol, with Tarnower, who was attempting to take the pistol away from Harris. Their evidence was based upon unused police photographs, and a 1984 inspection of the murder scene which had been preserved for four years.

Eleven years after Harris's conviction, Governor Mario Cuomo commuted the remainder of her sentence on December 29, 1992, as she was being prepped for quadruple bypass heart surgery. She was released from prison by the parole board and initially planned to live in a cabin in New Hampshire, but later moved to the Whitney Center, a retirement home in Hamden, Connecticut.

Death
Harris died of natural causes on December 23, 2012, at an assisted-living center in New Haven, Connecticut at age 89. She was survived by her sons, David and Jimmie.

Cultural references
Harris' story was told by Diana Trilling in the 1982 book Mrs. Harris, and by the journalist Shana Alexander in the 1983 book Very Much a Lady: The Untold Story of Jean Harris and Dr. Herman Tarnower.

Harris' murder trial was depicted in the 1981 made-for-television movie The People vs. Jean Harris. She was portrayed by Ellen Burstyn, who was nominated for an Emmy Award and a Golden Globe Award for the performance. Burstyn was later nominated for another Emmy for a cameo role as one of Tarnower's former lovers in Mrs. Harris, a 2005 movie in which Annette Bening played Jean Harris. The 2005 film, by HBO Films, depicts Harris' relationship with Tarnower from beginning to end, including the trial. Ben Kingsley starred opposite Bening as Tarnower. Bening and Kingsley received Emmy and Golden Globe nominations for the film.

In the 1995 movie Dolores Claiborne, the journalist daughter Jennifer Jason Leigh asks her mother, Kathy Bates, why she killed her husband. The daughter then excuses herself by saying, "Don't feel too bad, Ma. I asked Jean Harris the same thing once."

In the 1997 Seinfeld episode "The Summer of George", Raquel Welch plays herself portraying Harris in a fictional Tony Award-winning musical about the murders called Scarsdale Surprise.

Harris and Tarnower are referenced in Christine Lavin's song "Cold Pizza for Breakfast".

The October 4, 2013, episode of the show Deadly Women tells Harris' story from when she met Tarnower to when she killed him. The episode is called "Vengeance".

The Sophia Smith Collection at Smith College in Northampton, Massachusetts, has a collection of Harris' records.

Barbara Walters did several interviews with Harris over the years, on November 16, 2015, Walters aired an episode on American Scandals called "Jean Harris: The Headmistress Murderer".

References

General
 Jean Harris' biography at The Biography Channel

Notes

Further reading
 Trilling, Diana . Mrs Harris. New York: Viking, December 1982. 
 Alexander, Shana. Very Much a Lady: The Untold Story of Jean Harris and Dr. Herman Tarnower. New York: Little Brown & Co, 1983. 
 Harris, Jean. Stranger in Two Worlds.  New York: MacMillan Publishing Company, 1986.
 Harris, Jean, They Always Call Us Ladies Published by Charles Scribner's Sons, New York, NY, (1988)
 Harris, Jean, Marking Time Published by Kensington Publishing Corp. New York, NY (1993)
 A&E "American Justice" episode: "The Scarsdale Diet Docter Murder"

External links
 N.Y. Times Obituary for Jean Harris
 
 "Jean Harris: Murder with Intent to Love" "Time" article (04/09/1981)
 Jean Struven Harris papers at the Sophia Smith Collection, Smith College Special Collections

1923 births
2012 deaths
People from Cleveland
American female murderers
American female criminals
American people convicted of murder
People convicted of murder by New York (state)
Heads of American boarding schools
Smith College alumni
Criminals from Ohio
Prisoners sentenced to life imprisonment by New York (state)
American headmistresses